The Kalmius is one of two rivers flowing through the Ukrainian city of Mariupol. The other is the Kalchyk), which flows into the Kalmius. The Kalmius flows into the Sea of Azov near the Azovstal steel manufacturing complex in Mariupol. 

Kalmius is said to be the name of a 16th-century Cossack encampment where the town of Pavlovsk was founded, later renamed Mariupol.

The Kalmius Trail was a Tatar raiding trail, one of the branches of the Muravsky Trail.

After an offensive by the separatist forces of the Donetsk People's Republic in August 2014 during the War in Donbas, in southern Donetsk Oblast, the river became the boundary between Donetsk People's Republic-controlled territory to the east, and Ukrainian government-controlled territory to the west. A Donetsk People's Republic unit was named "Kalmius" Battalion.

References

Drainage basins of the Sea of Azov
Rivers of Donetsk Oblast